Nesoselandria morio is a species of  sawflies belonging to the family Tenthredinidae subfamily Tenthrediniinae. It is the only species of the genus Nesoselandria.

Taxonomy
Some authors consider Dulophanes morio a valid name and Nesoselandria morio a synonym.

Distribution
This species is present in the Nearctic realm and in most of Europe to Siberia and Japan.

Description
Head, antennae, thorax and abdomen are black. Legs arecompletely yellow-orange, except the basal segment. Wings are darkly infuscate.

References

External links
 Bug Guide
 Kopzanek
The sawflies (Symphyta) of Britain and Ireland

Tenthredinidae
Insects described in 1781